Senad Husić (born 12 April 1990) is a Bosnian footballer who plays for German amateur club SC Pfullendorf.

Career statistics

Honours
Diósgyőr
Hungarian League Cup (1): 2013–14

References

External links
 
 MLSZ 
 
 Profile – Pfullendorf

1990 births
Living people
People from Kalesija
Association football fullbacks
Bosnia and Herzegovina footballers
Bosnia and Herzegovina under-21 international footballers
NK Zvijezda Gradačac players
Diósgyőri VTK players
FK Željezničar Sarajevo players
NK Čelik Zenica players
IFK Åmål players
KF Llapi players
SC Pfullendorf players
Premier League of Bosnia and Herzegovina players
Nemzeti Bajnokság I players
Football Superleague of Kosovo players
Bosnia and Herzegovina expatriate footballers
Expatriate footballers in Hungary
Expatriate footballers in Sweden
Expatriate footballers in Kosovo
Bosnia and Herzegovina expatriate sportspeople in Hungary
Bosnia and Herzegovina expatriate sportspeople in Sweden
Bosnia and Herzegovina expatriate sportspeople in Kosovo
Expatriate footballers in Germany
Bosnia and Herzegovina expatriate sportspeople in Germany